Pennsylvania Route 430 (PA 430) (also known by the Pennsylvania Department of Transportation as SR 0430) is a  state highway located in Erie County, Pennsylvania.  The western terminus is at US 20 in Wesleyville.  The eastern terminus is the New York state line near Findley Lake, New York.

Route description 

PA 430 begins at an intersection with US 20 (Buffalo Road) in the borough of Wesleyville just south of the railroad tracks through the borough. PA 430 proceeds southeast along Station Road, a two-lane residential street through Wesleyville, running several blocks through the borough. At the junction with Euclid Boulevard, PA 430 and Station Road turn eastward while the right-of-way becomes Shannon Road. Becoming a commercial street through the eastern parts of the borough, soon crossing into Harborcreek Township. Crossing southeast through the township, PA 430 returns to a two-lane residential road, entering the Brookside neighborhood.

Through Brookside, PA 430 remains a two-lane residential street, soon leaving the community for another portion of Harborcreek Township. The route then intersects and merges with PA 290 (the Bayfront Connector). PA 290 and PA 430 become concurrent eastward along the four-lane arterial. Station Road becomes a frontage road for the Connector, which soon turns southeast into an interchange with exit 32 of I-90. At this interchange, PA 290 ends and PA 430 continues southeast along Station Road as the Bayfront Connector ends. Still in Harborcreek Township, PA 430 bends eastward as a two-lane residential road, which slowly becomes a two-lane rural roadway. The route then enters the village of Owens Corners, where it intersects with the southern terminus of PA 531 (Depot Road).

Continuing east from PA 531, PA 430 climbs some local hills and becomes more rural as it climbs through Harbocreek Township. Crossing into Greenfield Township, the route becomes more residential as it runs down the hill, retaining the Station Road moniker. The route becomes more rural again as the route enters the village of Hornby, soon crossing the southern end of Greenfield Community Park. PA 430 runs along a curve to the northeast and immediately turns east into an intersection with PA 89. After PA 89, PA 430 turns northeast further through another hill in Greenfield Township  Now a more rural highway, the route parallels to the south of I-86, where it turns southeast to the New York state line, marking the eastern end of PA 430. The route continues east along Station Road on New York State Route 430 (NY 430).

History 
State Route 430 was assigned to a previously unnumbered roadway in Erie County in 1959. The route was assigned as a continuation of New York State Route 430 (assigned by 1935 in NY), which had been extended from Mayville. The two designations have remained the same since.

Major intersections

See also

References

External links

Pennsylvania Highways: PA 430

430
Transportation in Erie County, Pennsylvania